'Jaurah is a town and union council of Gujrat District, in the Punjab province of Pakistan. It is part of Kharian Tehsil and is located on Dinga-Lalamusa Road at 32°40'0N 73°50'0E with an altitude of 233 metres (767 feet) It is home to the prominent Doga, Paswal, Mehar,Syed and Rajpoot KhoKhar tribes. It is a business hub and trading location for local villages. It is amongst the larger villages in the surrounding area.

References

Union councils of Gujrat District
Populated places in Gujrat District